Hutnik Kraków, Hutnik Nowa Huta – was a volleyball section of the same name club from Poland based in Nowa Huta, Kraków's district. It existed in 1950–1993. The club competed in the highest level of Polish Volleyball League. Two–time Polish Champion (1988, 1989), and three–time Polish Cup winner (1974, 1988, 1990).

Honours
 Polish Championship
Winners (2): 1987–88, 1988–89

 Polish Cup
Winners (3): 1973–74, 1987–88, 1989–90

References

Polish volleyball clubs
Sport in Kraków
Volleyball clubs established in 1950
1950 establishments in Poland